Adaora Akubilo is a Nigerian-American model.

Early life 
Adaora was born in Windsor, CT and at the age of six she moved to her father’s home village in Nigeria. She spent approximately 10 years in Nigeria learning about their culture and their way of life. When she moved back to Connecticut she was approached by a John Casablancas model scout, Tina Kiniry, and her modeling career started.

Career 
In 2007, Akubilo appeared on NBC as one of the 12 finalists in the Sports Illustrated Swimsuit Model Search. In 2012, Adaora attended an interview with Sports Illustrated at her home town modeling agency, John Casablancas. She was accepted to appear on the show and flew out to Los Angeles to shoot the Sports Illustrated TV Show. She then went on to appear in the 2012 and 2013 Sports Illustrated Swimsuit Editions. Her career also includes campaigns for Covergirl, Garnier Nutrisse, House of Dereon, Ray Ban, Boden, Abercrombie, Mary Kay, Ulta, Burts Bees, and Avon. She is now signed with New York Model Management.

References

Living people
Female models from Connecticut
American people of Nigerian descent
Year of birth missing (living people)
People from Windsor, Connecticut
21st-century American women